The Clement B. Gingrich House is a historic building located in La Porte City, Iowa, United States. Gingrich grew up on a nearby farm, and was a teacher before he operated the family's creamery.  He hired Waterloo architect J.G. Ralston to design this house, which was completed in 1916.  Architecturally, the two-story frame structure is "transitional" in its design.  It features Georgian cube massing, with Prairie School, American Craftsman and Colonial Revival influences.  After Ella Gingrich died in 1943 the house was sold.  It served as the rectory for Sacred Heart Catholic Church from 1946 to 1973.  During that time the basement was used for a daily Mass chapel and catechism classes.  Twenty-seven interdenominational weddings were celebrated in the house.  After its use as a rectory it reverted to being a single-family home.  It was listed on the National Register of Historic Places in 1996.

References

Houses completed in 1916
La Porte City, Iowa
Houses in Black Hawk County, Iowa
National Register of Historic Places in Black Hawk County, Iowa
Houses on the National Register of Historic Places in Iowa